Samuel "Samu" García Sánchez (born 13 July 1990) is a Spanish former professional footballer who played as a right winger or a forward.

Club career
Born in Málaga, Andalusia, García played his first years as a senior with UD Dos Hermanas San Andrés and Tercera División team CD Alhaurino, before joining Málaga CF's reserves in 2010 and going on to compete several seasons at that level with the club. In 2004, at the age of 14, he was signed by Chelsea in the Premier League, but returned to his hometown after only three months after failing to adjust.

In the summer of 2013, García was called to the first team by newly appointed manager Bernd Schuster. He signed his first professional contract shortly after, keeping him at the La Rosaleda Stadium until June 2016.

García made his official debut with Málaga's main squad on 17 August 2013, coming on as a second-half substitute in a 0−1 La Liga away loss against Valencia CF. He scored his first goal on 3 November, playing less than ten minutes and netting in the 93rd minute of a 3−2 derby home win over Real Betis.

Both García and his Málaga teammate Samu Castillejo joined Villarreal CF on 18 June 2015, signing a five-year deal. On 30 June of the following year, the former transferred to Russian Premier League club FC Rubin Kazan alongside coach Javi Gracia.

On 19 January 2017, García joined CD Leganés on loan until the end of the top-flight season. On 24 August, he signed a three-year contract with fellow league team Levante UD but, the following transfer window, returned to Málaga on a five-month loan.

García left Levante on 14 January 2019.

References

External links

1990 births
Living people
Spanish footballers
Footballers from Málaga
Association football wingers
Association football forwards
La Liga players
Tercera División players
Atlético Malagueño players
Málaga CF players
Villarreal CF players
CD Leganés players
Levante UD footballers
Russian Premier League players
FC Rubin Kazan players
Spanish expatriate footballers
Expatriate footballers in Scotland
Expatriate footballers in England
Expatriate footballers in Russia
Spanish expatriate sportspeople in Scotland
Spanish expatriate sportspeople in England
Spanish expatriate sportspeople in Russia